Robroyston railway station serves the suburbs of Millerston and Robroyston in Glasgow, Scotland. The station is located on the Cumbernauld Line, and is managed by ScotRail. The station, which includes a park and ride facility and a through road connecting the two communities, opened on 15 December 2019. It is part of a wider development plan for the local area including 1,600 new houses.

There was previously a Robroyston station (and a marshalling yard) at the same location, on the line originally operated by the Garnkirk and Glasgow Railway which later formed part of the Caledonian Railway main line; this operated from 1898 to 1917, and from 1919 to 1956.

Services
There is a reduced service on Sundays, with only 1tph each way.

Facilities

The station acts as a park and ride location, with space for 258 cars.

References

External links
 
Video footage of Robroyston railway station.

Former Caledonian Railway stations
Railway stations in Glasgow
SPT railway stations
Railway stations served by ScotRail
Reopened railway stations in Great Britain
Railway stations in Great Britain opened in 1898
Railway stations in Great Britain closed in 1956
Railway stations in Great Britain opened in 2019
Railway stations opened by Network Rail